Bearno's Pizza is a pizza franchise based in Louisville, Kentucky with about 14 locations in Kentucky and Indiana.

Overview
Bearno's Pizza was established in 1977 and is owned and operated by Bearno's Inc. A subsidiary, Bearno's International LLC, markets the chain to international franchisees. So far, Bearno's International has partnered with U.S. Hospitality International LLC to open two restaurants in Beijing. E. Joseph Steier, Bearno's chairman and CEO, hopes to expand to 40 more locations in China, and possibly Thailand and other Far East nations.

Bearno's Pizza serves Sicilian pizza and their original pizza commonly referred to as Louisville-style Pizza In addition to pizza, Bearno's is known for its stromboli steak sandwich. The company also purveys other food products.

Reception
Bearno's Pizza was listed in Pizza Today magazine's Hot 100 Companies list, published in June 1999.

See also

 List of pizza chains of the United States

References

External links
Bearno's Pizza website

Companies based in Louisville, Kentucky
Pizza chains of the United States
Regional restaurant chains in the United States
Restaurants in Kentucky
Restaurants in Louisville, Kentucky
Restaurants established in 1977
1977 establishments in Kentucky
American companies established in 1977